Leona Neumannová (born 14 August 1987 in Rokytnice nad Jizerou, Czechoslovakia) is a female Czech volleyball player.

Career 
After finishing her training at the Czech clubs of SK Ješzědská Liberec and VK Dukla Liberec, Neumannová played for Slavia Prague from 2010 until 2012. After that, she transferred to the Belgian club Dauphines Charleroi, with whom she reached 13th place in the 2012–13 Women's CEV Cup. In the 2014/15 season, Neumannová left TSV Sonthofen in the Second German League to join Köpenicker SC in the First German League. At the half-way stage in the season, she transferred to NawaRo Straubling in the Second German League, with whom she would win the Second German League South. After that, she moved to Swiss club Volley Top Luzern.

References

External links 
 Profile on CEV

1987 births
Living people
Czech women's volleyball players
People from Rokytnice nad Jizerou
Expatriate volleyball players in Belgium
Expatriate volleyball players in Germany
Expatriate volleyball players in Switzerland
Czech expatriate sportspeople in Belgium
Czech expatriate sportspeople in Germany
Czech expatriate sportspeople in Switzerland
Sportspeople from the Liberec Region